JJK Jyväskylä (JJK; full name Jyväskylän Jalkapalloklubi) is a Finnish football club, based in Jyväskylä. JJK plays its home matches at Harjun Stadion.

History

Early years 1923–1992 
Jyväskylän Palloilijat (abbreviated JyP), the predecessor of JJK, was founded in December 1923. In addition to football JyP had also a pesäpallo team and a bandy team. In the JJK's first football match it was defeated 2–3 by Mikkelin Kilpaveikot. In its early years, JyP played football infrequently and usually worked just to make the game of football known in the city. JyP began competing in football leagues in 1928 when it was beaten in a qualification match by Savo in the regional league. In 1939, JyP qualified for the first time to play in the second highest level of Finnish football leagues.

Nevertheless, World War II halted the promising progress of the team. In 1941, JyP played against a friendly match against a German military team. As many as 6000 spectators followed the match in Harju Stadium.

In the following years, JyP played in the Finnish lower divisions, from the 3rd tier to 6th tier, but in 1976 JyP managed to rise to Kakkonen (third tier). In the next year, a new organisation was founded for the football team. The new team was named JYP-77. In the beginning of 1980s JYP-77 played couple of years in the First Division. But, 1992 the team relegated again to Kolmonen (fourth tier).

New JJK 1992–2006 
In autumn 1992 football managers in Jyväskylä decided that a reform is needed in football in Jyväskylä. JYP-77 merged with JyPK (Jyväskylän Pallokerho) and formed a new team JJK (Jyväskylän Jalkapalloklubi). Already first season was a success and JJK was promoted to Kakkonen (third tier) in 1993. 1994 JJK was far from the top of the league even though Mika Väyrynen won the top scorer award of the league with 22 goals. In 1995 JJK won a qualifier against KPT-85 and was promoted to Ykkönen (second tier).

In the Ykkönen JJK played strongly especially at home, where it was defeated only once. Ville Priha and Sükrü Uzuner were some of the leading heroes of the team. Also audience found Harju and a match against Kuusysi Lahti had already 2547 spectators.

Season 1997 ended in a catastrophe. Even though the team had invested a lot to the new season it relegated back to Kakkonen (third tier). JJK could not promote back during next seasons. When JJK Juniors in 2000 managed to promote also to Kakkonen a new reform was started. The name was changed to JJK Jyväskylä. Nevertheless, JJK could not promote back to the Ykkönen.

Between 2000 and 2006 the team lost a lot of gifted juniors including Jukka Sinisalo, Touko Tumanto, Mikko Manninen to teams playing on higher levels.

From a black hole to the top 2006–2011 
During unsuccessful decades Central Finland was nicknamed a black hole of Finnish football. Jyväskylä was the only major Finnish city, which had not had a football team in the top league. In 2006 Ville Priha returned to his home city – this time as a coach. The new coach with his team including Lassi Lehtonen, Jussi Hakasalo and a young promising striker Tommi Kari celebrated in the end of the season a promotion back to Ykkönen.

Before the 2007 season, JJK got new strengthenings with a defender Jukka Sinisalo returning from FC Inter, midfielder Matti Lähitie and striker Babatunde Wusu from Mikkeli. The team ended up being third in the league. The team continued to strengthen with Markus Paija, Mika Lahtinen, Anssi Viren and Ady. The hero of team Babatunde Wusu capped in the last game against PS Kemi and secured a historic moment for Jyväskylä – a promotion to the Veikkausliiga (highest level).

First top league season 2009 was not easy for JJK even though Jukka-Pekka Tuomanen from Jaro and Christian Sund joined the team. It finished playing relegation games but managed to win them. Nevertheless, the average number of spectators was third highest in the league, 3238 per game.

2010 was not easier but 2011 JJK exploded the bank. The team finished 3rd in the league and celebrated the first medal in its history in Finnish Veikkausliiga. This meant also that in 2012 JJK plays for the first time in its history in UEFA European League.

JJK in Europe 

Third place in the league in 2011 qualified the club to play in the 2012-13 UEFA Europa League. JJK played in the first qualification round in the UEFA Europa League in season 2012–13. In the first round JJK played against Norwegian Stabæk and won with the aggregate score 4–3. In the second round JJK faced FK Zeta from Montenegro, and lost based on the away goals rule (aggregate score 3–3).

The league season, however, was lukewarm compared to the previous with the club finishing in ninth place.

Anniversary of football in Jyväskylä and relegation 

During the 2013 season the club planned to celebrate the 90th anniversary of club football history in Jyväskylä. The pre-season went well as the club beat for example HJK in the Finnish League Cup and reached the finals. As the Veikkausliiga season started, the difficulties began. Eero Markkanen, who was responsible for scoring the most goals pre-season, was injured in the season opener and injuries plagued the team throughout the season. After Midsummer, JJK was in last place.

About in the middle of the season, a draw in the home game against RoPS drove the club to change its manager mid-season for the second time in its history. Kari Martonen was replaced by the team's former player, assistant coach Juha Pasoja. The change was followed by a brief improvement in the team's play, but at the end of the season, however, the team was relegated back to Ykkönen, eventually with quite clear figures. The positive feature was how in particular towards the end of the season some younger, home-grown players rose to the team in place of some more experienced players who were injured. For example the young stopper Severi Vielma and the midfielder Robert Taylor, who had just returned to his hometown after a few years in England, made their way to the starting lineup.

The season was dramatic for the club also outside the field. Poor financial situation forced the club to ask for help from their supporters. As part of the "Emme anna sen päättyä" ("We won't allow it to end") -campaign the club sold various products and collected over 90 000 euros, which allowed the club to continue operation to the next season.

For the season 2014 in Ykkönen, the team was reorganized as many experienced players left and young, home-grown players were brought in their place. Long-time players Janne Korhonen and Mikko Manninen stayed in the team, however, and took also some coaching duties. Tommi Kari, who had played for FC Lahti for two years, returned to JJK and was later elected as the team captain for the season 2014. Many young players were brought in from the youth teams, such as Aleksis Lehtonen, Joona Itkonen and the goalkeeper Teppo Marttinen. During the spring of 2014 the team made to the top eight in the Finnish Cup beating for example Veikkausliiga team TPS.

Season to season

Domestic

UEFA club competition record

Notes
 1Q: First qualifying round
 2Q: Second qualifying round

Supporters 
The supporter group of the club is called Harjun Pojat ("Boys of Harju"), named after that club's home stadium.

Current squad

Villiketut 
Villiketut is the reserve team of JJK. The team plays in Kolmonen in 2018 season.

Management and boardroom

Management
As of 5 August 2018

Boardroom
As of 1 January 2018

Managers 
 Markku Kekäläinen (1994–95)
 Ilkka Hyvärinen (1994–95)
 Markku Kekäläinen (1996)
 Anssi Leino (1996)
 Esa Kuusisto (1997)
 Boguslaw Hajdas (1998)
 Juha-Pekka Nuutinen (1999)
 Heikki Nurmi (2000)
 Matti Lahtinen (2001–02)
 Ari Kautto (2003–05)
 Markku Kekäläinen (2005)
 Ville Priha (Jan 2006 – Dec 09)
 Kari Martonen (Jan 2010 – Jun 13)
 Juha Pasoja (Jun 2013–Mar 2018)
 Mikko Manninen, Janne Korhonen (Mar 2018–)

References

External links 
 

 
Football clubs in Finland
Sport in Jyväskylä
Association football clubs established in 1923
Bandy clubs established in 1923